Chinn is a surname, originating both in England and among overseas Chinese communities.

Origins and statistics
It is also a spelling, based on the pronunciation in some varieties of Chinese including Hakka, of the surname pronounced Chen in Mandarin. The similarly spelled surname Chin also shares both of these origins.

According to statistics cited by Patrick Hanks, 1,316 people on the island of Great Britain and four on the island of Ireland bore the surname Chinn in 2011. In 1881 there were 1,032 people with the surname in Great Britain, primarily at Warwickshire and Cornwall.

The 2010 United States Census found 6,211 people with the surname Chinn, making it the 5,601st-most-common name in the country. This represented an increase in absolute numbers, but a decrease in relative frequency, from 6,146 (5,220th-most-common) in the 2000 Census. In both censuses, about half of the bearers of the surname identified as White, one-quarter as Asian, and one-fifth as Black.

People
 Adrienne Chinn (1960), Canadian author
Alva Chinn, American model
 Andrew Chinn (1915–1996), American artist and art educator of Chinese descent
 Anthony Chinn (1930–2000), Guyanese-born British actor
 Benjamen Chinn (1921–2009), American photographer
 Betty Kwan Chinn, American philanthropist who works with homeless people
 Bob Chinn (film director) (born 1943), American pornographic film director
 Bob Chinn (restaurateur) (born 1923), American restaurateur, owner of Bob Chinn's Crab House
 Bobby Chinn (born 1954), New Zealand chef and television presenter
 Carl Chinn (born 1956), English historian
 Conor Chinn (born 1987), American soccer forward
 George M. Chinn (1902–1987), United States Marine Corps colonel and weapons expert
 Howard A. Chinn (1906–?), American audio engineer
 Ian Chinn (1917–1956), Australian rules footballer 
 Jeanne Chinn, American actress
 Jeremy Chinn (born 1998), American football player
 Joseph W. Chinn (1866–1936), American lawyer and judge from Virginia
 Julia Chinn
 Kathy L. Chinn, American politician from Missouri
 Ken Chinn (1962–2020), Canadian punk rock musician
 Lori Tan Chinn, American actress
 Marlin Chinn (born 1970), American basketball coach
 Menzie Chinn (born 1961), American economist
 May Edward Chinn (1896–1980), African-American woman physician
 Mike Chinn (born 1954), English horror, fantasy, and comics writer
 Nicky Chinn (born 1945),  English songwriter and record producer
 Oscar Chinn, British transport company operator in Congo, involved in the Permanent Court of International Justice's Oscar Chinn Case
 Phyllis Chinn (born 1941), American mathematician
 Simon Chinn, British film producer
 Thomas Withers Chinn (1791–1852), American politician from Louisiana
 Sir Trevor Chinn (born 1935), British businessman and philanthropist
 Trevor Chinn (glaciologist) (–2018), New Zealand scientist

Fictional characters
 Maya Chinn, minor character in the American soap opera Passions

See also
Chin (surname)

References

English-language surnames